That's the Spirit is an American short musical film released in 1933. It features an African American cast starring Noble Sissle and was directed by Roy Mack. The Vitaphone film was distributed by Warner Brothers. The film survives. 

That's the Spirit includes Noble Sissle Orchestra performing "Tiger Rag", Jack Carter singing "Saint Louis Blues", Cora LaRedd dancing and singing to "Jig Time" and the Washboard Stompers performing "Stomp".

It has been described as "one of the greatest all-black jazz shorts ever made." The plot features Mantan Moreland and Flournoy Miller as two watchmen who hear singing from a haunted pawn shop. A miniature jazz band comes to life led by Noble Sissle and featuring clarinetist Buster Bailey. Cora LaRedd sings and dances to "Jig Time".

The film includes various special effect gags repeated to ghostly apparitions. It is believed to be Mantan Moreland's first film.

That's the Spirit was included in a jazz program at Festival of the Arts at Wilmington College in 1968.

Cast
Noble Sissle as band leader
Mantan Moreland as Night Watchman
F. E. Miller as Night Watchman
Buster Bailey performing on clarinet
Cora La Redd as singer and dancer
Washboard Serenaders

Reception 
A Variety review was largely critical of the film. “Noble Sissle and his band of colored musicians are no appealing sights on the screen to general theatre audiences. Where the shadowy effects are used, okay. Therefore, no particularly keen screen fare is this short".

References

1933 short films
African-American films